Le casseur de pierres is a 1989 Tunisian short drama film directed by Mohamed Zran. It was screened in the Un Certain Regard section at the 1990 Cannes Film Festival.

Cast
 Abdallah Maymoun - Sabeur
 Monia Tkitik - Monia
 Fatha Mahdoui - Fatima
 Moufida Zran - Scheherezade

References

External links

1989 films
1989 crime drama films
1980s French-language films
French drama short films
Films directed by Mohamed Zran
Tunisian drama films
Tunisian short films